Daphne Ann Shaw is a former international lawn bowls competitor for Australia.

Bowls career
Shaw started bowling in 1977 and won the 1979 North Haven Club Championship.

In 1990 she won a gold medal at the 1990 Commonwealth Games in Auckland. In 1991 Daphne won the NSW Champion of Club Champions singles title and won a gold medal in the pairs and a silver in the singles at the Asia Pacific Bowls Championships. In 1996 she won the gold medal in the fours and silver medal in the triples at the 1996 World Outdoor Bowls Championship in Adelaide.

She was inducted into Bowls NSW Hall of Fame in 2016 and in May 2021, she opened a new green at the New Haven Bowls Club, which is named after her.

Personal life
Daphne married her husband Colin in 1963 and has been the mentor for Karen Murphy.

References

Date of birth missing (living people)
Australian female bowls players
Bowls World Champions
Commonwealth Games medallists in lawn bowls
Commonwealth Games gold medallists for Australia
Bowls players at the 1990 Commonwealth Games
1943 births
Living people
20th-century Australian women
Medallists at the 1990 Commonwealth Games